George H. Lawton House is a historic home located at Colonie in Albany County, New York.  It was built about 1852 and is a -story cottage in the Gothic Revival style. It has board and batten siding, exposed roof rafters, and a 1-story porch with simple supports.  It is a distinctive example of mid-19th-century "pattern book" architecture.

It was listed on the National Register of Historic Places in 1985.

References

Houses on the National Register of Historic Places in New York (state)
Gothic Revival architecture in New York (state)
Houses completed in 1852
Houses in Albany County, New York
National Register of Historic Places in Albany County, New York
1852 establishments in New York (state)